Yours (Original Spanish title: Tuya) is a 2010 Venezuelan and Uruguayan  fantasy drama film, directed by Ivan Mazza.

Plot
One night, while returning home by bus, Jorge (Albi De Abreu) receives a box from a strange old man. After he throws it away, the mysterious box keeps coming back to haunt him and test him in unexpected ways.

Cast
 Albi De Abreu ... Jorge
 Armando Cabrera ... El Viejo
 Luigi Sciamanna ... Gustaf
 Rafael Soliwoda ... Marcelo
 Prakriti Maduro ... Amalia
 María de Los ángeles García ... Muchacha En Autobús
 Victoria Medina ... Gustavito

Production
Yours is an independently financed short film, produced by Mike Medina and Ivan Mazza. It was filmed in Caracas, mostly in the El Hatillo Municipality. Filming took five non consecutive days during the month of April 2009. Editing and sound post production took place in Caracas for a period of six months. Color correction was finished in Montevideo, Uruguay, in the second week of the month of February 2010. It was premiered in the 50th Cartagena Film Festival in the Official Iberoamerican Competition that took place between the 25th of February and the 5th of March 2010.

Recognition

Film Awards
28th Uruguay International Film Festival 2010
Best Short Film (Winner)
 14th Florianopolis Audiovisual Mercosur (FAM 2011)
 Best Short Film (Winner Audience Award)

Official selections
50th Cartagena Film Festival 2010
Best Iberoamerican Short Film (Nominated)
42nd Nashville Film Festival 2011
Best Short Film (Nominated)
27th Bogotá Film Festival 2010
Best Short Film (Nominated)
6th Cinemaissí Film Festival 2010
Best Short Film (Nominated)

References

External links

2010 films
Uruguayan short films
Venezuelan short films
2010 short films
2010s Spanish-language films